Hafeez-ur-Rehman Khan Dreshak (born 1 January 1957) is a Pakistani politician who had been a member of the National Assembly of Pakistan, from June 2013 to May 2018.

Life and career
Dreshak was born on 1 January 1957.

He ran for the seat of Provincial Assembly of Punjab as a candidate of Pakistan Peoples Party (PPP) from Constituency PP-248 (Rajanpur-II) in 2008 Pakistani general election but was unsuccessful. He received 15,452 votes and lost the seat to an independent candidate, Sardar Athar Hassan Khan Gorchani.

He was elected to the National Assembly of Pakistan as a candidate of Pakistan Muslim League (N) (PML-N) from Constituency NA-175 (Rajanpur-II) in 2013 Pakistani general election. He received 110,573 votes and defeated an independent candidate, Mir Dost Muhammad Khan Mazari.

References

Living people
Pakistan Muslim League (N) MNAs
Pakistani MNAs 2013–2018
1957 births